The World Masters Orienteering Championships 2018 was the 23rd World Masters Orienteering Championships(WMOC) organised and held in Denmark with 4200 participants from 45 countries. The WMOC is an annual international orienteering competition and the official world championship for orienteering runners above the age of 35. This is the largest orienteering event ever held on Danish soil. The champions were coming from 23 countries. The Danish organizers were using the WMOC as a promotional opportunity and arranged around the event several local competitions for the Danish public, which attracted participation in all ages.

Sprint 
The sprint competitions took place in Hørsholm north of Copenhagen (qualifications) and in central Copenhagen (finals). 25 champions were celebrated the first final day 8 July 2018.

MEN M35

WOMEN W35

MEN M40

WOMEN W40

MEN M45

WOMEN W45

MEN M50

WOMEN W50

MEN M55

WOMEN W55

MEN M60

WOMEN W60

MEN M65

WOMEN W65

MEN M70

WOMEN W70

MEN M75

WOMEN W75

MEN M80

WOMEN W80

MEN M85

WOMEN W85

MEN M90

WOMEN W90

MEN M95

Middle distance
Middle Final took place in Tisvilde Hegn situated on the north coast of the island Zealand.
Famous from numerous big events throughout the history, Tisvilde Hegn is legendary in Danish Orienteering for its special vegetation and characteristic contour features. 24 champions were celebrated the second final day 11 July 2018.

MEN M35

WOMEN W35

MEN M40

WOMEN W40

MEN M45

WOMEN W45

MEN M50

WOMEN W50

MEN M55

WOMEN W55

MEN M60

WOMEN W60

MEN M65

WOMEN W65

MEN M70

WOMEN W70

MEN M75

WOMEN W75

MEN M80

WOMEN W80

MEN M85

WOMEN W85

MEN M90

WOMEN W90

Long distance
The long distance final took place in the classic Grib forest, which is one of the largest in Denmark. The terrain is typical for eastern Denmark and yet challenging due to its complex varieties of vegetation – from thick spruce forest to hilly, yet fast old beech forest areas. Despite the fact that wood cutting has been extensive over the previous years, large areas of old spruce still provides for fast running. 24 champions were celebrated the third final day 13 July 2018.

MEN M35

WOMEN W35

MEN M40

WOMEN W40

MEN M45

WOMEN W45

MEN M50

WOMEN W50

MEN M55

WOMEN W55

MEN M60

WOMEN W60

MEN M65

WOMEN W65

MEN M70

WOMEN W70

MEN M75

WOMEN W75

MEN M80

WOMEN W80

MEN M85

WOMEN W85

MEN M90

WOMEN W90

References

External links 
 

Orienteering competitions